Coronel Bolognesi Fútbol Club is a Peruvian football club located in the city of Tacna. Originally founded on 18 October 1929, It was named after Francisco Bolognesi. Years later, a second branch of the club called Club Sport Bolito, was founded on 27 May 1998. 

The club quickly surpassed its older counterpart's achievements and, following its success in 2001 Copa Perú, the president's club Elena Martorell (Fernando Martorell's sister, then president of CD Coronel Bolognesi), decided to change the club's name to Coronel Bolognesi Fútbol Club, in order to further identify both clubs's identities and share their successes. The identity confusion escalated since Coronel Bolognesi FC's international performances in the 2000s and 2010s, and hence generated much controversy about whether they're the same club or not.

Rivalries
Coronel Bolognesi has had a long-standing rivalry with Alfonso Ugarte (Tacna) and Mariscal Miller.

Stadium
Coronel Bolognesi play their home games at the Estadio Jorge Basadre, located in the city of Tacna.

Notable players

Peruvian players
 Germán Carty
 Juan Cominges
 Paul Cominges
 Johan Fano
 Miguel Mostto
 Diego Penny
 Luis Ramírez
 Junior Ross
 Johan Vásquez
 David Soria Yoshinari

Foreign players
 Federico Martorell
  José Andrés Bilibio
 Masakatsu Sawa
 Miguel Ostersen

Honours

National

League
Peruvian Primera División:
Runner-up (1): 2007

Torneo Clausura:
Winners (1): 2007

Torneo Interzonal:
Winners (2): 1977, 1978

Copa Perú:
Winners (2): 1976, 2001
Runner-up (2): 1998, 2000

Regional
Región VIII:
Winners (4): 1998, 1999, 2000, 2001

Liga Departamental de Tacna:
Winners (20): 1966, 1967, 1970, 1971, 1972, 1973, 1974, 1994, 1995, 1996, 1997, 1998, 1999, 2000, 2001, 2013, 2015, 2016, 2017, 2019
Runner-up (2): 2004, 2022

Liga Provincial de Tacna:
Winners (5): 2008, 2013, 2015, 2016, 2017
Runner-up (3): 2014, 2019, 2022

Liga Distrital de Tacna:
Winners (9): 1966, 1967, 1970, 2012, 2013, 2014, 2017, 2019, 2022
Runner-up (3): 2008, 2011, 2015

Performance in CONMEBOL competitions
Copa Libertadores: 1 appearance
2008: First Round

Copa Sudamericana: 3 appearances
2004: Preliminary Round
2006: First Round
2007: First Round

References

 
Football clubs in Peru
Association football clubs established in 1929